Cabo Corrientes may refer to:

 Cabo Corrientes (municipality), a municipality in Jalisco, Mexico
 Cabo Corrientes, Chocó, a cape on the Pacific coast of Colombia
 Cabo Corrientes, Cuba, a cape in the extreme west of Cuba
 Cabo Corrientes, Jalisco, a cape in Jalisco, Mexico
 Cabo Corrientes, Mar del Plata, a cape in Argentina
 Cabo Corrientes, Malvinas, the Spanish name for Cape Carysfort on East Falkland

See also
Cape Correntes, a cape in Mozambique, sometimes referred to as "Cape Corrientes"